That's My Meat is a 1931 American Pre-Code comedy film short directed by Fatty Arbuckle and starring Alfred "Al" St. John.

See also
 Fatty Arbuckle filmography

External links

1931 films
1931 comedy films
American black-and-white films
Educational Pictures short films
Films directed by Roscoe Arbuckle
American comedy short films
Films with screenplays by Jack Townley
Films with screenplays by John Grey
1930s English-language films
1930s American films